The CSA Women's Provincial T20 Competition is a women's domestic Twenty20 cricket competition organised by Cricket South Africa. The tournament began in the 2012–13 season, and currently sees sixteen teams competing.

Western Province are the most successful side in the history of the competition, with seven title wins, as well as being the current holders, winning the 2021–22 tournament.

History
The tournament began in the 2012–13 season, running alongside the CSA Women's Provincial League. Sixteen teams competed in four groups, with the group winners progressing to the knockout rounds. Western Province won the competition, beating Gauteng in the final. The following tournament, 2013–14, was won by Boland, who beat Northerns in the final.

Western Province then went on to win the next four competitions, between 2014–15 and 2017–18. North West ended their run in 2018–19, winning all five of their matches to win their first T20 title. The 2019–20 season was ended prematurely due to the COVID-19 pandemic, but was won by Western Province based on results that had occurred before the tournament was cut short.

The 2020–21 season was cancelled due to the ongoing COVID-19 pandemic. The tournament returned for the 2021–22 season, beginning in January 2022, with Western Province winning their seventh T20 title.

Matches in the tournament are played using a Twenty20 format, with sixteen teams competing. Currently, the tournament has a top tier "Top 6" league, with the winner of the league winning the competition, and two lower Pools, A and B, with promotion and relegation. Teams in the top division play each other twice, whilst teams in the lower pools play each other once.

Teams

Results

See also
 CSA Women's Provincial Programme
 Women's T20 Super League
 CSA Provincial Competitions

References

CSA Women's Provincial T20 Competition
South African domestic cricket competitions
Women's cricket competitions in South Africa
Recurring sporting events established in 2012
2012 establishments in South Africa